Atriplex patula (spear saltbush; common orache; spear orach; spreading orach) is a ruderal, circumboreal species of annual herbaceous plant in the genus Atriplex naturalized in many temperate regions.

Description 
The branches extend outwards from the stem with rhomboid leaves and separated clusters of flowers. The species accumulates salt from the environment in its tissues. Unlike other Atriplex species, it lacks notable salt bladders to excrete salt onto the leaves.

Taxonomy 
The species was a member of the family Chenopodiaceae, now part of Amaranthaceae, the amaranth family.

Distribution and habitat 
The species has a wide range, including semi-arid deserts and coastal areas in Asia, North America, Europe, and Africa. It commonly grows along roads and waste sites.

Although it is commonly asserted that the species has been naturalized in North America only since the 18th century, seeds ascribed to this species occur on the west coast of North America in buried marsh deposits that predate European contact.

Uses 
The young leaves and shoots are edible raw or cooked and suffice as a spinach substitute.

The species has been proven to be effective in lowering salt content in soils when planted in areas with high road salt contamination.

References

patula
Flora of Asia
Flora of Europe
Salt marsh plants
Flora of New Jersey
Plants described in 1753
Taxa named by Carl Linnaeus
Flora without expected TNC conservation status